Gichin Fuhiniu (born 20 August 1988) is a Cook Islands footballer who plays as a midfielder for Manukau City and the Cook Islands national football team. In August 2011 he was selected as part of the football team for the 2011 Pacific Games. He made his debut for the national team on 22 November 2011 in a 3–2 loss against Samoa.

In October 2017 Fuhiniu participated in the "Raro Rumble" charity boxing event, losing to Tamatoa Hunter.

References

External links
 

Living people
1988 births
Association football defenders
Cook Islands international footballers
Cook Island footballers